Frew may refer to;

People

Given name
Frew McMillan, a professional male tennis player from South Africa

Surname
Frew (surname)

Other
Frew, Kentucky
Frew, West Virginia
Frew River, the Northern Territory of Australia
Bridge of Frew, Ford of Frew, North Mid Frew, South Mid Frew, Wester Frew. Area on the upper River Forth west of Stirling, Scotland.
Frew Publications, publishes Lee Falk's The Phantom comic in Australia